The Middlesex County Magnet Schools, formerly known as the Middlesex County Vocational and Technical Schools, is a public school district that provides a network of high schools serving the vocational and technical education needs of students in Middlesex County, New Jersey, United States. The district was the first county vocational school system in the United States. The district serves high school, adult, and special needs students.

As of the 2020–21 school year, the district, comprised of six schools, had an enrollment of 2,100 students and 176.0 classroom teachers (on an FTE basis), for a student–teacher ratio of 11.9:1.

The high school campuses in the district are located in East Brunswick Township, Edison, Perth Amboy, Piscataway and Woodbridge Township.

Awards and recognition
Middlesex County Academy for Allied Health and Biomedical Sciences in Woodbridge was one of 11 in the state to be recognized in 2014 by the United States Department of Education's National Blue Ribbon Schools Program.

Perth Amboy Technical High School was recognized by the National Blue Ribbon Schools Program in 2012, one of 17 schools in New Jersey to be honored that year.

Schools
Schools in the district (with 2020–21 enrollment data from the National Center for Education Statistics) are:

Middlesex County Academy at Edison with 169 students in grades 9-12
Middlesex County Academy for Allied Health and Biomedical Sciences at Woodbridge with 276 students in grades 9-12
East Brunswick Technical High School with 460 students in grades 9-12
Perth Amboy Technical High School with 272 students in grades 9-12
Piscataway Technical High School with 656 students in grades 9-12

Career majors
A description of each career major can be found on MCVTS's website.

The Academy at Edison
 Civil/Mechanical Engineering Technology
 Electrical/Computer Engineering Technology

East Brunswick
 Commercial Art/Marketing Design
 Graphic Arts
 Automotive Technology
 Machine Tool Technology
 Welding
 Architectural Drafting/CAD
 Carpentry
 Heating Ventilation Air Conditioning and Refrigeration (HVAC)
 Performing Arts Theatre
 Performing Arts Dance
 Agriscience Technology
 Baking
 Culinary Arts
 Cosmetology/Hairstyling
 Health Technology
 Automotive Services
 Basic Business Technology
 Building Services/Maintenance Mechanics
 Building Trades
 Dry Cleaning
 Food Services
 Health Services
 Masonry
 Retail Sales

Perth Amboy
 Auto Mechanics
 Computer Applications for Business
 Graphic Design
 Carpentry
 Electrical Technology
 Heating, Ventilation, Air Conditioning and Refrigeration
 Culinary Arts

Piscataway
 Computer Assisted Drafting
 Machine Tool Technology
 Automated Office Technology
 Computer Applications for Business
 Computer Systems Technology
 Automotive Collision Repair Technology
 Auto Mechanics
 Baking
 Culinary Arts: Commercial Foods
 Cosmetology/Hairstyling
 Apparel Services/Clothes Processing
 Auto Maintenance
 Auto Repair
 Basic Business Technology
 Building Trades
 Carpentry
 Culinary Arts: Career Development
 Hospitality: Hotel Services
 Landscaping/Horticulture
 Health Technology 
 Production Welding
 Sales Occupations
 Supermarket Careers

Academy at Woodbridge
 Biomedical Sciences
 Allied Health
 Computer Applications for Business/Health Careers
 Building Maintenance 
 Industrial Processing/Machine Trades

Administration
Core members of the district's administration are:
Jorge E. Diaz, Superintendent
Karl Knehr, Business Administrator / Board Secretary

Board of education
The board of education is comprised of the county superintendent of schools and four members appointed by the Board of County Commissioners.

References

External links
Middlesex County Magnet Schools

School Data for the Middlesex County Vocational and Technical Schools, National Center for Education Statistics

East Brunswick, New Jersey
School districts in Middlesex County, New Jersey
Vocational school districts in New Jersey